Iron Post is a historic boundary marker located in New Albin, Iowa, United States.  An Act of Congress on March 3, 1849, sought to resolve the boundary issue between the State of Iowa and the newly established Minnesota Territory. This cast iron post was placed here by Captain Thomas Lee of the U.S. Army Corps of Topographical Engineers. He determined that North latitude 43 degrees, 30 minutes was indeed the border between the two entities, which the United States Congress had designated on August 4, 1846, as Iowa's northern border.  It also served as a correction for the townships that had been established below the line, and as a practical surveying base for the territory to the north from this point all the way to the Big Sioux River. 

The post is an obelisk that rises .  It is painted an aluminium color, and bears inscriptions on its four faces: "Iowa" (south), "Minnesota" (north), "1849" (east), and "Lat 43 degrees 30 minutes" (west).   It was brought here across the frozen Mississippi River from Victory, Wisconsin by John Ross on a sled pulled by a team of oxen.  The post was listed on the National Register of Historic Places in 1976.

References

Buildings and structures completed in 1849
Buildings and structures in Allamakee County, Iowa
National Register of Historic Places in Allamakee County, Iowa
Historic surveying landmarks in the United States
Boundary markers
1849 establishments in Iowa